Arkendale is a village and civil parish in the Harrogate district of North Yorkshire, England. It consists of a Pub, a Village Hall, a Church and is close to Staveley village.

The first part of the toponym originates from Old English , meaning probably "precious, noble, true", and cognate to the name Archibald.

References

External links

http://www.arkendale.org.uk

Villages in North Yorkshire
Civil parishes in North Yorkshire